D1, D01, D.I, D.1 or D-1 can refer to:

Science and technology

Biochemistry and medicine
 ATC code D01 Antifungals for dermatological use, a subgroup of the Anatomical Therapeutic Chemical Classification System
 Dopamine receptor D1, a protein
 Haplogroup D1 (Y-DNA)
 Vitamin D1, a form of Vitamin D
 DI, Iodothyronine deiodinase type I, an enzyme involved with thyroid hormones

Technology

 Nikon D1, a digital single-lens reflex camera 
 D1, former brand of T-Mobile in Germany
 D1, an abbreviation for DOCSIS 1.0 1.0, an international telecommunications standard
 D-1 (Sony), an early digital video recording format
 STS-61-A, also known as D-1, the 22nd mission of NASA's Space Shuttle program
 D-1, from the Proton (rocket family), Russian rockets
 Mercedes D.I, a 1913 German aircraft engine

Military

World War I fighter aircraft
 AEG D.I
 Albatros D.I
 Halberstadt D.I, experimental version of Halberstadt D.II (and Aviatik D.I variant)
 Aviatik (Berg) D.I
 Daimler D.I
 Deutsche Flugzeug-Werke D.I
 Euler D.I
 Flugzeugbau Friedrichshafen D.I
 Fokker D.I
 Hansa-Brandenburg D.I
 Junkers D.I
 Knoller D.I, an Imperial and Royal Aviation Troops aircraft
 Phönix D.I
 Schütte-Lanz D.I
 Siemens-Schuckert D.I
 WKF D.I, an Imperial and Royal Aviation Troops aircraft

Other uses in military
 Char D1, a 1930s French tank
 Dewoitine D.1, a 1920s French single-seat fighter aircraft
 Dunne D.1, a 1907 British experimental aircraft 
 152 mm howitzer M1943 (D-1), a Soviet World War II artillery system
 , British early 20th century submarine
 , a 1909 American submarine

Transportation

Locomotives and trams
 D1-class, a variant of D-class Melbourne tram
 D1 multiple unit, a train built in 1960s-1980s in Hungary for Soviet railways
 LB&SCR D1 class, an 1873 British tank locomotive
 NCC Class D1, a Northern Counties Committee Irish gauge steam locomotive
 Pennsylvania Railroad class D1, an 1868 American steam locomotive
 Bavarian D I, an 1871 Bavarian tank locomotive
 Min'an Electric D01, a sports luxury vehicle

Roads
 D1 road (Croatia)
 D1 motorway (Czech Republic)
 D1 motorway (Slovakia)

Other uses in transportation
 D1, a model of BSA Bantam British motorcycle
 D1, a commuter rail line of Moscow Central Diameters
 D1 Denby Darts, a bus service in Yorkshire, UK
 BYD D1, an electric multi purpose vehicle (MPV)

Sports
 NCAA Division I, D-I, the highest division of American collegiate athletics
 D1 Grand Prix, a production car drifting series from Japan
 D1NZ, a production car drifting series in New Zealand

Other uses
 D1 (building), a residential building in Dubai
 D1 (Longs Peak), a technical climbing route in Colorado, U.S.
 D1, a Dublin postal district
 D1, a guitar model by C. F. Martin & Company
 D1, a code in Town and country planning in the United Kingdom
 D1, a transmittered juvenile female bald eagle from the 2011 clutch of the Decorah Bald Eagles
D1, a discount store chain from Colombia.
 D-1 visa, a non-immigrant U.S. visa
 "D-1", a song from Yves (single) by Loona
 D1 Recordings, an Irish independent techno record label
 D01, ECO code for the Richter-Veresov Attack chess opening
 Digital One - also known as D1 National, a digital radio multiplex in the United Kingdom

See also 
 Di (disambiguation)